In fiber optics, mode volume is the number of bound modes that an optical fiber is capable of supporting.  

See also
Equilibrium mode distribution
Mode scrambler
Mandrel wrapping

References

Fiber optics